Hubert Damisch (28 April 1928 – 14 December 2017), was a French philosopher specialised in aesthetics and art history, and professor at the École des Hautes Études en Sciences Sociales (EHESS) in Paris from 1975 until 1996.

Damisch studied at the Sorbonne with Maurice Merleau-Ponty and, later, with Pierre Francastel. In 1967 he founded the Cercle d’histoire/théorie de l’art that would later become the CEHTA (Centre d'histoire et théorie des arts) at the EHESS.

Damisch has written extensively on the history and theory of painting, architecture, photography, cinema, theatre, and the museum.  His works are landmark references for a theory of visual representations. He died on 14 December 2017, aged 89.

Selected books in French
 1966: Alexandres Iolas (éd.), Hubert Damisch, lettre à Matta. Matta, lettre à Hubert Damisch, New York, Genève, Milan, Paris.
 1972: Théorie de la peinture. Pour une histoire de la peinture, Paris, Seuil.
 1972: Théorie du nuage: pour une histoire de la peinture, Paris, Seuil, 1972.
 1974: Huit thèses pour (ou contre ?) une semiologie de la peinture.
 1976: Ruptures/Cultures. Paris, Éditions du Minuit, 1976.
 1984: Fenêtre jaune cadmium ou les Dessous de la peinture. Paris, Seuil, 1984.
 1987: L’origine de la perspective. Paris, Flammarion, 1987.
 1992: Le jugement de Pâris. Iconologie analytique, I, Paris, Flammarion, 1992.
 1993: L’Art est-il nécessaire ?.
 1993: Américanisme et modernité. L'idéal américain dans l'architecture (co-directeur avec Jean-Louis Cohen), Paris, EHESS-Flammarion, 448 p. Lire le compte-rendu.
 1995: Traité du trait: tractatus tractus, Paris, Réunion des Musées Nationaux, 1995.
 1997: Skyline. La ville narcisse, Paris, Seuil, 1996.
 1997: Un "souvenir d'enfance" par Piero della Francesca. Paris, Seuil, 1997.
 1999: Hubert Damisch et Jacqueline Salmon, Villa Noailles, Marval.
 2000: L’amour m'expose. Le projet Moves, Bruxelles, Y. Gevaert, 2000 [rééd., Paris, Klincksieck, 2007].
 2001: La Dénivelée. À l'épreuve de la photographie, Paris, Seuil, 2001.
 2001: La peinture en écharpe: Delacroix, la photographie, Paris, Klincksieck, 2001.
 2004: Voyage à Laversine, Paris, Seuil, 2004.
 2008: Ciné fil, Paris, Seuil, 2008.

Books in English
 1994: The origin of perspective; translated by John Goodman. Cambridge, Mass.: MIT Press, 1994. 
 1996: The judgment of Paris; translated by John Goodman. Chicago: University of Chicago Press, 1996. , .
 1997: Moves: playing chess and cards with the museum/Moves: schaken en kaarten met het museum; with an essay by Ernst van Alphen. Rotterdam: Museum Boijmans Van Beuningen, 1997. .
 2001: Skyline: the narcissistic city; translated by John Goodman. Stanford University Press, 2001. , .
 2002: A theory of /cloud/: toward a history of painting; translated by Janet Lloyd. Stanford University Press, 2002. , .
 2007: A childhood memory by Piero della Francesca; translated by John Goodman. Stanford University Press, 2007. , .
 2016: Noah's Ark: Essays on Architecture; introduction by Anthony Vidler, translated by Julie Rose. MIT Press, 2016. , .

Critical influence
 Baetens J. Exposer dans un musée. Une lecture sémiotique à partir du travail d’Hubert Damisch 
 Bird J. Hubert Damisch. Oxford: Oxford UP, 2005.
 Bowman, M, “The Intertwining—Damisch, Bois, and October’s Rethinking of Painting” in Journal of Contemporary Painting, volume 5, issue 1, April 2019, pp. 99–116. doi: 10.1386/jcp.5.1.99_1 
 Cohn, D. (ed.). Y voir mieux, y regarder de plus près: autour d’Hubert Damisch. Paris: Rue d’Ulm, 2003

References

External links
An homage to Hubert Damisch - short biography, quotes and propositions from his books - in French
The CEHTA official homepage
Official website of the École des hautes études en sciences sociales

1928 births
2017 deaths
French art historians
University of Paris alumni
20th-century French philosophers
20th-century French writers
21st-century French philosophers
21st-century French writers
20th-century French historians
21st-century French historians
20th-century French male writers
French male non-fiction writers
Writers from Paris